Agathia lycaenaria is a species of moth of the family Geometridae first described by Vincenz Kollar in 1848. It is found from India to Australia.

Subspecies

Agathia lycaenaria lycaenaria
Agathia lycaenaria chizumon Inoue, 1956
Agathia lycaenaria reducta Inoue, 1961
Agathia lycaenaria samuelsoni Inoue, 1964
Agathia lycaenaria subreducta Inoue, 1982

References

Geometrinae
Moths described in 1848
Moths of Asia
Moths of Australia